The 2009 Villanova Wildcats football team represented Villanova University in the 2009 NCAA Division I FCS football season. They played their home games at Villanova Stadium in Villanova, Pennsylvania. They were co-champions of the Colonial Athletic Association (CAA) and advanced to the National Championship game where they defeated Montana, 23–21. It was Villanova's first national championship in football, marking them as the only team to have both an NCAA Division I Football and Men's Basketball championship (the FCS is the only official NCAA Division I Football Championship). They finished with a record of 14–1, 7–1 in CAA play.

Schedule

Roster

References

Villanova
Villanova Wildcats football seasons
NCAA Division I Football Champions
Colonial Athletic Association football champion seasons
Villanova Wildcats football